Analeesia Fernandes (born Dec 12, 1999) is a Cape Verdean basketballer who played for Rhode Island College. She now plays for the Cape Verde women's basketball team.

High school
Fernandes is a 2018 graduate of Brockton High School. She was named the team's MVP in her senior year.

College
As a freshman at Rhode Island College she played in 23 games, averaging 3.7 points and 3.2 rebounds per game.

National team career
She participated in the 2019 and 2021 FIBA Women's AfroBasket events with her national team and averaged 4.7 points, 1 rebounds, 0.3 and 6.3 points, 3.7 rebounds, 0.3 assists respectively.

References

1999 births
Living people
Women's basketball players in the United States
Cape Verdean women